The Hungarian Electronic Library is one of the most significant text-archives of the Hungarian Web space showcasing a variety of primary and secondary sources. Contains thousands of full-text works in the humanities and social sciences. Topics covered include science, math, technology, arts, and literature. Most texts are in Hungarian, though some have been translated into English.

References

External links
 Official website

Library 2.0
Hungarian digital libraries
Digital humanities projects